Joshua Hunt (born 14 March 1982) is a former professional Australian rules footballer who played for the Geelong Football Club the Greater Western Sydney Giants in the Australian Football League.

Career

Early career
Hunt was drafted by Geelong with pick 44 in the 2000 AFL draft. He was recruited from the Bendigo Pioneers, a team in the TAC Cup, where he had played most of his football in the forward line. He won a long-kicking competition at age 15, with his powerful left footed kicks regularly travelling over 60 metres.

He made his debut in round 8 of the 2001 season against Fremantle, but played only 15 games in his first three seasons. He missed most of 2003 because of severe fractures to his shins.

2004–2014

2004 was Hunt's breakthrough year. He played in 24 games, including finals, kicked 3 goals and had an average of 13 disposals.

He was also given the responsibility of kicking in after an opposition behind and has quickly become one of the best exponents of the art. His long, accurate, left foot kicks have often resulted in attacking opportunities for Geelong.

It was Hunt's outstanding performance in the backline that cemented him a weekly place in the playing team.

Hunt played 22 games in 2005, missing two games due to appendicitis. He was a late withdrawal from the Cats' round 21 one-point win against Richmond, and had surgery the next day. He missed round 22 and returned to play against Melbourne in the following weekend's elimination final.

In 2006, he was criticised when he shirked taking a mark in a round 19 match against St Kilda. St Kilda capitalised on the incident to goal and steal the match. Hunt's bravery and attack on the ball, despite his bulk was brought under question.

2007 was a reasonable season for Hunt, playing 16 games, with an average of 17 disposals. He ventured outside of his usual position in the backline to kick a total of three goals.

Hunt was hospitalised after Geelong's narrow 5-point preliminary final victory over Collingwood for dehydration. He was vomiting after the game after receiving a knock to the stomach, and was admitted to Geelong Hospital the following morning to be treated for dehydration. He recovered in time to play a part in Geelong's premiership victory in the following weekend's grand final against Port Adelaide.

An ACL injury sustained in the preseason kept him sidelined for 2009, missing out on playing in Geelong's 2009 premiership team.

He returned in 2010, playing 24 matches and followed on in 2011 with 22 matches, including his second premiership victory, in the 2011 AFL Grand Final.

On 30 September 2013, Hunt was delisted by Geelong after 13 seasons.

On 26 August 2014, Hunt announced his retirement from the AFL.

Statistics

|-
|- style="background-color: #EAEAEA"
! scope="row" style="text-align:center" | 2001
|style="text-align:center;"|
| 41 || 6 || 0 || 0 || 16 || 15 || 31 || 7 || 8 || 0.0 || 0.0 || 2.7 || 2.5 || 5.2 || 1.2 || 1.3
|-
! scope="row" style="text-align:center" | 2002
|style="text-align:center;"|
| 41 || 7 || 1 || 1 || 23 || 10 || 33 || 13 || 15 || 0.1 || 0.1 || 3.3 || 1.4 || 4.7 || 1.9 || 2.1
|- style="background-color: #EAEAEA"
! scope="row" style="text-align:center" | 2003
|style="text-align:center;"|
| 41 || 2 || 0 || 0 || 13 || 8 || 21 || 6 || 6 || 0.0 || 0.0 || 6.5 || 4.0 || 10.5 || 3.0 || 3.0
|-
! scope="row" style="text-align:center" | 2004
|style="text-align:center;"|
| 41 || 24 || 3 || 3 || 191 || 114 || 305 || 68 || 62 || 0.1 || 0.1 || 8.0 || 4.8 || 12.7 || 2.8 || 2.6
|- style="background-color: #EAEAEA"
! scope="row" style="text-align:center" | 2005
|style="text-align:center;"|
| 41 || 22 || 2 || 1 || 238 || 116 || 354 || 98 || 30 || 0.1 || 0.0 || 10.8 || 5.3 || 16.1 || 4.5 || 1.4
|-
! scope="row" style="text-align:center" | 2006
|style="text-align:center;"|
| 8 || 22 || 4 || 4 || 239 || 152 || 391 || 96 || 49 || 0.2 || 0.2 || 10.9 || 6.9 || 17.8 || 4.4 || 2.2
|- style="background-color: #EAEAEA"
! scope="row" style="text-align:center" | 2007
|style="text-align:center;"|
| 8 || 16 || 3 || 1 || 143 || 132 || 275 || 72 || 43 || 0.2 || 0.1 || 8.9 || 8.3 || 17.2 || 4.5 || 2.7
|-
! scope="row" style="text-align:center" | 2008
|style="text-align:center;"|
| 8 || 23 || 3 || 3 || 200 || 189 || 389 || 89 || 38 || 0.1 || 0.1 || 8.7 || 8.2 || 16.9 || 3.9 || 1.7
|- style="background-color: #EAEAEA"
! scope="row" style="text-align:center" | 2009
|style="text-align:center;"|
| 8 || 0 || — || — || — || — || — || — || — || — || — || — || — || — || — || —
|-
! scope="row" style="text-align:center" | 2010
|style="text-align:center;"|
| 8 || 24 || 1 || 3 || 210 || 181 || 391 || 117 || 42 || 0.0 || 0.1 || 8.8 || 7.5 || 16.3 || 4.9 || 1.8
|- style="background-color: #EAEAEA"
! scope="row" style="text-align:center" | 2011
|style="text-align:center;"|
| 8 || 22 || 4 || 1 || 203 || 141 || 344 || 103 || 58 || 0.2 || 0.0 || 9.2 || 6.4 || 15.6 || 4.7 || 2.6
|-
! scope="row" style="text-align:center" | 2012
|style="text-align:center;"|
| 8 || 18 || 5 || 5 || 185 || 97 || 282 || 106 || 43 || 0.3 || 0.3 || 10.3 || 5.4 || 15.7 || 5.9 || 2.4
|- style="background-color: #EAEAEA"
! scope="row" style="text-align:center" | 2013
|style="text-align:center;"|
| 8 || 12 || 3 || 1 || 105 || 67 || 172 || 54 || 18 || 0.3 || 0.1 || 8.8 || 5.6 || 14.3 || 4.5 || 1.5
|-
! scope="row" style="text-align:center" | 2014
|style="text-align:center;"|
| 32 || 14 || 4 || 4 || 135 || 61 || 196 || 67 || 29 || 0.3 || 0.3 || 9.6 || 4.4 || 14.0 || 4.8 || 2.1
|- class="sortbottom"
! colspan=3| Career
! 212
! 33
! 27
! 1901
! 1283
! 3184
! 896
! 441
! 0.2
! 0.1
! 9.0
! 6.0
! 15.0
! 4.2
! 2.1
|}

References

External links

 
 

Living people
1982 births
Australian rules footballers from Victoria (Australia)
Geelong Football Club players
Geelong Football Club Premiership players
Bendigo Pioneers players
Greater Western Sydney Giants players
Southport Australian Football Club players
Two-time VFL/AFL Premiership players